Mercury-Redstone 4 was the second United States human spaceflight, on July 21, 1961. The suborbital Project Mercury flight was launched with a Mercury-Redstone Launch Vehicle, MRLV-8. The spacecraft, Mercury capsule #11, was nicknamed Liberty Bell 7. It was piloted by astronaut Virgil "Gus" Grissom.

The flight went as expected until just after splashdown, when the hatch cover, designed to release explosively in the event of an emergency, accidentally blew. Grissom was at risk of drowning, but was recovered safely via a U.S. Navy helicopter. The spacecraft sank into the Atlantic and was not recovered until 1999.

Mission parameters
 Mass: 1 286 kg
 Maximum altitude: 190.39 km
 Range: 486.15 km
 Launch vehicle: Redstone rocket

Spacecraft
The MR-4 spacecraft, Mercury capsule #11, was designated to fly the second crewed suborbital flight in October 1960. It came off McDonnell's St. Louis production line in May 1960. Capsule #11 was the first Mercury operational spacecraft with a centerline window instead of two portholes. It was closer to the final orbital version than was Alan Shepard's Freedom 7. Dubbed Liberty Bell 7 by its pilot, it featured a white, diagonal, irregular paint stripe starting at the base of the capsule and extending about two-thirds toward the nose, emulating the crack in the famed Liberty Bell in Philadelphia, Pennsylvania.

Explosive hatch

Liberty Bell 7 also had a new explosive hatch release. This would allow an astronaut to exit the spacecraft quickly in the event of an emergency. Emergency personnel could also trigger the explosive hatch from outside the spacecraft by pulling on an external lanyard. Both the pop-off hatch and the lanyard are standard features of ejection seats used in military aircraft, but in the Mercury design, the pilot still had to exit the craft himself, or be removed by emergency personnel. The original exit procedure was to climb out through the antenna compartment, after removing a small pressure bulkhead. This was a difficult and slow procedure. Removal of an injured or unconscious astronaut through the top hatch would be nearly impossible. The original side hatch was bolted shut with 70 bolts and covered with several spacecraft shingles, making it a slow process to open the original hatch.

McDonnell Aircraft engineers devised two different quick release hatches for the Mercury spacecraft. The first had a latch, and was used on Ham's (a chimpanzee) MR-2 and Shepard's MR-3 missions. The second design was an explosive release hatch. The quick release latching hatch weighed 69 lb (31 kg), too much of a weight addition to use on the orbital version of the spacecraft. The explosive hatch design used the 70 bolts of the original design, but each quarter-inch (6.35 mm) titanium bolt had a  hole bored into it to provide a weak point. A mild detonating fuse (MDF) was installed in a channel between the inner and outer seal around the periphery of the hatch. When the MDF was ignited, the resulting gas pressure between the inner and outer seal would cause the bolts to fail in tension.

There were two ways to fire the explosive hatch during recovery. On the inside of the hatch was a knobbed plunger. The pilot could remove a pin and press the plunger with a force of 5 or 6 lbf (25 N). If the pin was left in place, a force of 40 lbf (180 N) was required to detonate the bolts. An outside rescuer could blow open the hatch by removing a small panel near the hatch and pulling a lanyard.

Window
The new trapezoidal window on Liberty Bell 7 replaced the two  side portholes that were on Freedom 7. The Corning Glass Works of Corning, New York designed and developed the multilayered panes that comprised the new window. The inner pane was made of three inner glass panels bonded to form a single inner pane. This new window assembly was as strong as any part of the spacecraft pressure vessel.

Controls
The manual controls of Liberty Bell 7 incorporated a new rate stabilization control system. This allowed fine control of spacecraft attitude movements by small turns of the hand controller. Previously a lot of jockeying of the device was needed to maintain the desired attitude. This rate damping, or rate augmentation system, gave finer and easier handling qualities and a redundant means of firing the pitch, yaw, and roll thrusters.

Before the Mercury-Redstone 4 mission, Lewis Research Center and Space Task Group engineers had determined that firing the posigrade rockets into the booster-spacecraft adapter, rather than in the open, developed 78 percent greater thrust. This achieved a greater spacecraft-booster separation through a kind of "pop-gun" effect. By using this technique, the spacecraft separated at velocity of about  rather than  using the old procedure. The Mercury-Redstone 4/Liberty Bell 7 mission would take advantage of this new procedure.

Additional hardware changes to Liberty Bell 7 were a redesigned fairing for the spacecraft-Redstone adapter clamp-ring and additional foam padding added to the head area of the contour couch. The fairing changes and additional foam were used to reduce vibrations the pilot experienced during the boost phase of flight. The spacecraft instrument panel was rearranged to provide a better eye scan pattern.

Mission description
In January 1961, NASA's Director of the Space Task Group, Robert Gilruth, told Gus Grissom that he would be the primary pilot for Mercury-Redstone 4. John Glenn was the backup pilot for the mission.

Redstone launch vehicle MRLV-8 arrived at Cape Canaveral on June 8, 1961. A mission review on July 15, 1961, pronounced Redstone MRLV-8 and Mercury spacecraft #11 ready to go for the Mercury-Redstone 
4 mission.

Also, on July 15, 1961, Gus Grissom announced he would name Mercury-Redstone 4, Liberty Bell 7. Grissom said the name was an appropriate call-sign for the bell-shaped spacecraft. He also said the name was synonymous with "freedom". As a tribute to the original Liberty Bell, a "crack" was painted on the side of the spacecraft.

The Mercury 4 mission was planned as a repeat of MR-3. Grissom would experience a maximum acceleration of 6.33 g (62 m/s) and deceleration of 10.96 g (107 m/s).

The launch of Liberty Bell 7 was first planned for July 16. The cloud cover was too thick and the launch was postponed until July 18. On July 18, it was again postponed due to weather. Both times, the pilot had not yet boarded the spacecraft. On July 19, 1961, Grissom was on board when the flight was delayed again due to weather. At that point, it had just 10 minutes 30 seconds to go before launch.

On the morning of July 21, 1961, Gus Grissom entered the Liberty Bell 7 at 8:58 UTC and the 70 hatch bolts were put in place. At 45 minutes prior to the scheduled launch, a pad technician discovered that one of the hatch bolts was misaligned. During a 30-minute hold that was called, McDonnell and NASA Space Task Group engineers decided that the 69 remaining bolts should be sufficient to hold the hatch in place and blow it at the appropriate time. The misaligned bolt was not replaced.

Liberty Bell 7 was launched at 12:20:36 UTC, July 21, 1961.

Launch

Grissom later admitted at the postflight debriefing that he was "a bit scared" at liftoff, but he added that he soon gained confidence along with the acceleration increase. Hearing the engine roar at the pedestal, he thought that his elapsed-time clock had started late. Like Shepard, he was amazed at the smooth quality of the liftoff, but then he noticed gradually more severe vibrations. These were never violent enough to impair his vision.

Watching his instruments for the pitch rate of the Redstone, Grissom saw it follow directions as programmed, tilting over at about one deg/s.

During a 3 g (29 m/s) acceleration on the up-leg of his flight, Grissom noticed a sudden change in the color of the horizon from light blue to jet black. His attention was distracted by the noise of the tower-jettison rocket firing on schedule. Grissom felt the separation, and he watched the tower through the window as it drifted off, trailing smoke, to his right. Grissom had a strong sensation of tumbling during the transition from high to zero acceleration, and, while he had become familiar with this sensation in centrifuge training, for a moment he lost his bearings.

The Redstone coasted for 10 seconds after its engine cut off; then a sharp report signaled that the posigrade rockets were popping the spacecraft loose from the booster. Although Grissom peered out his window throughout his ship's turnaround maneuver, he never caught sight of his booster.

Ballistic flight
With turnaround accomplished, the Air Force jet pilot for the first time became a space pilot, assuming manual-proportional control. A constant urge to look out the window made concentrating on his control tasks difficult. He told Shepard back in Mercury Control that the panorama of Earth's horizon, presenting an  arc at peak altitude, was fascinating. His instruments rated a poor second to the spectacle below.

Turning reluctantly to his dials and control stick, Grissom made a pitch movement change, but was past his desired mark. He jockeyed the handcontroller stick for position, trying to damp out all oscillations, then made a yaw movement and went too far in that direction. By the time the proper attitude was attained, the short time allocated for these maneuvers had been used, so he omitted the roll movement altogether. Grissom found the manual controls very sluggish when compared to the Mercury procedures trainer. He then switched to the new rate command control system and found perfect response, although fuel consumption was high.

After the pitch and yaw maneuvers, Grissom made a roll-over movement so he could see the ground from his window. Some land beneath the clouds (later determined to be western Florida around the Apalachicola area) appeared in the hazy distance, but the pilot was unable to identify it.

He saw Merritt Island, the Banana River, the Indian River, and what appeared to be a large airport runway. South of Cape Canaveral, he saw what he believed to be West Palm Beach.

Reentry
Grissom had initiated the retrorocket sequence and the spacecraft was arcing downward. His pulse reached 171 beats per minute. Retrofire gave him the distinct and peculiar feeling that he had reversed his backward flight through space and was actually moving face forward. As he plummeted downward, he saw what appeared to be two of the spent retrorockets pass across the periscope view after the retrorocket package had been jettisoned.

Pitching the spacecraft over into a reentry attitude of 14 degrees from Earth-vertical, the pilot tried to see the stars out his observation window. Instead the glare of sunlight filled his cabin, making it difficult to read the panel dials, particularly those with blue lights. Grissom thought that he would not have noticed the 0.05 g (0.5 m/s) light if he had not known it was about to flash on.

Reentry presented no problem. Grissom could not feel the oscillations following the acceleration buildup; he could only read them on the rate indicators. Meanwhile, he continued to report to the Mercury Control Center on his electric current reading, fuel quantity, acceleration, and other instrument indications.

Grissom said he saw the deployment and felt some resulting pulsating motion, but not enough to worry him. Watching the main chute unfurl, Grissom spotted a  L-shaped tear and another  puncture in the canopy. Dumping his peroxide control fuel, the pilot began transmitting his panel readings.

Splashdown
A "clunk" confirmed that the landing bag had dropped in preparation for impact. Grissom then removed his oxygen hose and opened his visor, but deliberately left the suit ventilation hose attached. Impact was milder than he had expected, although the spacecraft heeled over in the water until Grissom was lying on his left side. He thought he was facing downward. The spacecraft gradually righted itself, and, as the window cleared the water, Grissom jettisoned the reserve parachute and activated the rescue aids switch. Liberty Bell 7 still appeared to be watertight, although it was rolling badly with the swells.

Preparing for recovery, he disconnected his helmet and checked himself for debarkation. The neck dam did not unroll easily; Grissom tinkered with his suit collar to ensure his buoyancy in the event that he had to get out of the spacecraft quickly. He replied that he wanted them to wait five minutes while he recorded his cockpit panel data. Using a grease pencil with the pressure suit gloves was awkward, and several times the suit ventilation caused the neck dam to balloon, but Grissom simply placed his finger between neck and dam to allow the air to escape.

Hatch blows open

After logging the panel data, Grissom asked the helicopters to begin the approach for pickup. He removed the pin from the hatch-cover detonator and lay back in the couch. "I was lying there, minding my own business," he said afterward, "when I heard a dull thud." The hatch cover blew away, and salt water splashed into the spacecraft as it bobbed in the ocean. The capsule began taking on water and started to sink.

Grissom had difficulty recollecting his actions at this point, but he was certain that he had not touched the hatch-activation plunger. He had earlier unbuckled himself from most of his harness; he now removed his helmet, grasped the instrument panel with his right hand, and climbed though the hatchway.

Next he saw Grissom climb through the hatch and swim away.

Failed spacecraft recovery

Leaving aside the swimming astronaut, Lewis completed his approach to the sinking spacecraft, as both he and co-pilot John Reinhard were intent on spacecraft recovery. This action was a conditioned reflex based on past training experience. While training off the Virginia beaches the helicopter pilots had noted that the astronauts seemed at home in and to enjoy the water. So Reinhard quickly cut the high-frequency antenna as soon as the helicopter reached Liberty Bell 7. Throwing aside the antenna cutting device, Reinhard picked up the shepherd's-hook recovery pole and carefully threaded the crook through the recovery loop on top of the spacecraft. By this time Lewis had lowered the helicopter to assist Reinhard in his task to a point that the helicopter's three wheels were in the water. The capsule sank out of sight, but the pickup pole tangled as the attached cable went taut, indicating to the helicopter pilots that they had made the catch.

Reinhard immediately prepared to pass the floating astronaut the personnel hoist, but at that moment Lewis called a warning that a detector light had flashed on the instrument panel, indicating that metal chips were in the oil sump because of engine strain. Considering the implication of impending engine failure, Lewis told Reinhard to retract the personnel hoist while he called the second helicopter to retrieve Grissom.

Meanwhile, Grissom, having made certain that he was not snared by any lines, noticed that the primary helicopter was having trouble raising the submerged spacecraft. He swam back to the spacecraft to see if he could assist, but found the cable properly attached. When he looked up for the personnel line, he saw the helicopter start to move away.

Suddenly, Grissom realized that he was not riding as high in the water as he had been. All the time he had been in the water he kept feeling air escape through the neck dam. The more air he lost, the less buoyancy he had. Moreover, he had forgotten to secure his suit inlet valve. Swimming was becoming difficult, and now with the second helicopter moving in he found the rotor wash between the two aircraft was making swimming more difficult. Bobbing under the waves, Grissom was scared, angry, and looking for a swimmer from one of the helicopters to help him tread water. Then he caught sight of a familiar face, that of George Cox, aboard the second helicopter. Cox was the copilot who had retrieved both the chimpanzee Ham and Shepard on the first Mercury flight. With his head barely above water, Grissom found the sight of Cox heartening.

Cox tossed the "horse-collar" lifeline straight to Grissom, who immediately wrapped himself into the sling backwards. Lack of orthodoxy mattered little to Grissom now, for he was on his way to the safety of the helicopter, even though swells dunked him twice more before he got aboard. His first thought was to get a life preserver on. Grissom had been either swimming or floating for a period of only four or five minutes, "although it seemed like an eternity to me," as he said afterward.

As the first helicopter moved away from Grissom, it struggled to raise the spacecraft high enough to drain the water from the impact bag. At one point the spacecraft was almost clear of the water, but like an anchor it prevented the helicopter from moving forward. The pilot, watching his insistent red warning light, decided not to chance losing two craft in one day. He finally cast loose, allowing the spacecraft to sink swiftly. Martin Byrnes, aboard the carrier, suggested that a marker be placed at the point so that the spacecraft might be recovered later.

Aftermath
Substantial controversy ensued, as Grissom reported that the hatch had blown prematurely without his authorization. An independent technical review of the incident between August and October 1961 raised doubts regarding the theory that Grissom had blown the hatch and was responsible for the loss of the spacecraft. There is strong evidence that the Astronaut Office did not accept Grissom's guilt in the fact that he was maintained in the prime rotation spot for future flights, commanding the first Gemini flight, and the first planned Apollo flight.

Three Mercury flights later, Astronaut Wally Schirra manually blew Sigma 7'''s hatch after recovery when his spacecraft was on the deck of the recovery ship, in a deliberate attempt to dispel the rumor that Grissom might have blown the capsule's hatch deliberately. As anticipated, the kickback from the manual trigger left Schirra with a visible injury to his right hand. Grissom was uninjured when he exited the spacecraft, as documented by his postflight physical. This strongly supports his assertion that he did not accidentally hit the trigger, since in that case he would have been even more likely to injure himself.

In a 1965 interview, Grissom said that he believed the external release lanyard came loose, triggering the hatch release. On the Liberty Bell 7, this release lanyard was held in place by only one screw. This theory was accepted by Guenter Wendt, the Pad Leader for most early American crewed spaceflights.

During a launch simulation on Apollo 1 in 1967, the combination of a cabin fire and an inward-opening hatch contributed to the death of Grissom, as well as that of the astronauts Ed White and Roger B. Chaffee in a launch-pad fire. Use of an explosive hatch had been rejected following the discovery by engineers that, in fact, an explosive egress system on a spacecraft could inadvertently fire without being triggered. Following the Apollo fire, Block II Apollo spacecraft were equipped with rapid-opening systems.

In 2021, analysis of video of the recovery suggested that static electricity may have caused the premature detonation of the hatch bolts. Helicopters are known to build up a charge of static electricity due to the rotors moving through the air. Marine Corps Lt. John Reinhard, the crewman aboard the helicopter who used a set of shears containing explosive charges to snip off the antenna on the floating spacecraft (to allow the helicopter to go lower) reported that “when I touched the antenna there was an arc, and both cutters fired. At the same time, the hatch came off. It could be that some static charge set [the hatch] off.”

Recovery of Liberty Bell 7

After several unsuccessful attempts in 1992 and 1993, Oceaneering International, Inc. lifted the Liberty Bell 7 off the floor of the Atlantic Ocean and onto the deck of a recovery ship on July 20, 1999, the 30th anniversary of the Apollo 11 lunar landing. The team was led by Curt Newport and financed by the Discovery Channel.
Among the items found within were part of the flight gear and several Mercury dimes which were taken to space to be souvenirs of the flight.

After Liberty Bell 7 was secured on the deck of the recovery ship, the "Ocean Project", experts removed and disposed of an explosive device (SOFAR bomb) that was supposed to detonate in the event of the spacecraft's sinking, but which failed to explode. The spacecraft was then placed in a container filled with seawater to prevent further corrosion. The Cosmosphere, in Hutchinson, Kansas, disassembled and cleaned the spacecraft, and it was released for a national tour through September 15, 2006. The spacecraft was then returned to the Cosmosphere where it is on permanent display. In 2016, it was temporarily lent to The Children's Museum of Indianapolis.

Dramatization in film
Philip Kaufman's 1983 film The Right Stuff includes a dramatization of the Liberty Bell 7 mission in which Fred Ward played Gus Grissom.
Additional fictional representations also occur in HBO's 1998 From the Earth to the Moon with Mark Rolston as Gus Grissom and 2016's Hidden Figures movie with Devin McGee as Gus Grissom.

Timeline

Notes

References

 Mercury-Redstone 4 transcripts on Spacelog 
 This New Ocean: A History of Project Mercury - NASA SP-4201
 NASA MR-4 News Conference July 22, 1961, Cocoa Beach, FL
 Results Of The Second U.S. Manned Suborbital Spaceflight July 21, 1961 (NASA)
 Liberty Bell 7 Recovery Evaluation and Nondestructive Testing - NASA - December 1999 (PDF format)
 NASA Mercury MR4 press kit - July 13, 1961

External links
 Field Guide to American Spacecraft Pictures of Liberty Bell 7'' on display after recovery and restoration.

1961 in spaceflight
Project Mercury
Suborbital human spaceflights
1961 in Florida
July 1961 events
Gus Grissom